The Klondike Trail or Chalmers Trail was an overland route to the Klondike Gold Rush in the Yukon, Canada. Prospectors were reaching the Klondike via the American route over the Chilkoot Pass, and the northern route via Edmonton and the Athabasca River. Edmonton's merchants, however, promoted an overland route, which appeared shorter on the map, but proved to be arduous, treacherous, and took much longer to travel.

In attempt to improve the most deadly part of the trail between Fort Assiniboine and Lesser Slave Lake, the North-West Territorial government in Regina sent territorial road engineer Thomas W. Chalmers to survey and cut a new trail. Attempting to bypass muskeg and without consulting the local Indigenous people, who may have helped him find a better route, Chalmers set out in September 1897. He surveyed a route which traversed the highest point in the Swan Hills, about 20 kilometres east of the present day town of Swan Hills, nearly paralleling present-day Alberta Highway 33. He returned to Edmonton on November 7.

In the spring and summer of 1898 he and a road-cutting party cut  of what was expected to be a wagon trail out of the heavy bush. The trail started at Pruden's Crossing on the Athabasca River near Fort Assiniboine then headed north to the shore of Lesser Slave Lake near what would become Kinuso. From there it was still another 2,500 kilometres north to the gold fields. Chalmers declared the trail passable in July. It was a very difficult trail, taking some travellers months to cover. Travellers endured great danger and back-breaking labour. An estimated 2,000 horses died due to lack of feed, poor packing techniques and exhaustion. One human death is recorded: that of an unidentified little girl, whose grave is still marked along the trail east of Fort Assiniboine.

The gold rush declined the same year, however, and the last Yukon party to use the trail left Edmonton in August 1898. Use of the trail declined by 1901–02. The trail is mostly grown over now, although in parts near Fort Assiniboine, wagon ruts are still visible.

References

See also
 Chilkoot Trail from the coast of Alaska to Northern BC

Klondike Gold Rush
History of Alberta